Without You is a 1934 British comedy film directed by John Daumery and starring Henry Kendall, Wendy Barrie and Margot Grahame. It was made at Beaconsfield Studios as a quota quickie.

Cast
 Henry Kendall as Tony Bannister  
 Wendy Barrie as Molly Bannister  
 Margot Grahame as Margot Gilbey  
 Fred Duprez as Baron Gustav von Steinmeyer  
 George Harris as Harrigan  
 Billy Mayerl as Fink  
 Joe Hayman as Blodgett

References

Bibliography
 Chibnall, Steve. Quota Quickies: The Birth of the British 'B' Film. British Film Institute, 2007.
 Low, Rachael. Filmmaking in 1930s Britain. George Allen & Unwin, 1985.
 Wood, Linda. British Films, 1927-1939. British Film Institute, 1986.

External links

1934 films
British comedy films
1934 comedy films
Films shot at Beaconsfield Studios
Films directed by Jean Daumery
Quota quickies
British Lion Films films
British black-and-white films
1930s English-language films
1930s British films
English-language comedy films